A Love Letter to You is the debut commercial mixtape by American rapper Trippie Redd. It was released on May 26, 2017, by 	
TenThousand Projects and Caroline Distribution. It consists of 12 songs. The album peaked at number 64 on the Billboard 200.

Promotion
The lead single from the album, called "Love Scars" premiered on November 24, 2016 on SoundCloud. The song was later released to iTunes.

Critical reception

A Love Letter to You received acclaim from critics, who praised its harmonious delivery and diversity. The mixtape has a 79% approval rating on HotnewHipHop and is considered "HOTTTTT".

Commercial performance
A Love Letter to You reached number 64 on the Billboard 200 for chart dated January 27, 2018. and number 32 on US Top R&B/Hip-Hop Albums the following week. In March 2018, the mixtape has earned almost 300,000 album-equivalent units. On June 20, 2019, the mixtape was gold by the Recording Industry Association of America (RIAA) for combined sales and album-equivalent units of over 500,000 units in the United States.

Track listing

Charts

Weekly charts

Year-end charts

Certifications

References

2017 mixtape albums
Trap music albums
Trippie Redd albums
Albums produced by Pi'erre Bourne